Nil-Élie Larivière (July 11, 1899 – May 3, 1969) was a politician Quebec, Canada and a Member of the Legislative Assembly of Quebec (MLA).

Early life

He was born on July 11, 1899 in Bonfield, Ontario and became a farmer. Larivière moved to Rouyn-Noranda, Abitibi-Témiscamingue in 1925.

City politics

He served as a city councillor in Rouyn in 1926.

Member of the legislature

Larivière ran as an Action libérale nationale candidate in the district of Témiscamingue in the 1935 provincial election and won against incumbent Joseph-Édouard Piché. He joined Maurice Duplessis's Union Nationale and was re-elected in the 1936 election. Larivière was defeated by Liberal candidate Paul-Oliva Goulet in the 1939 election.

He was re-elected in the 1944 and 1948 elections. Larivière lost his bid for re-election in the 1952 election and was succeeded again by Goulet.

Death

He died on May 3, 1969.

References 

1899 births
1969 deaths
Action libérale nationale MNAs
Union Nationale (Quebec) MNAs
Franco-Ontarian people
People from Nipissing District
People from Rouyn-Noranda
Quebec municipal councillors